Rosemary Saal is an American mountaineer who at age 19 was a member of the first all African American climbing team to climb Denali in 2013. At age 25 she was the technical co-leaders for the first all-Black U.S. expedition team to summit Mount Kilimanjaro, in 2018.

On May 12, 2022 she was part of the first all-Black U.S. expedition team to summit Mount Everest.

Biography 
Saal was born in Seattle, WA. Saal started climbing at age 12 at Smith Rock State Park in Oregon, after joining Passages Northwest (now GOLD – Girls Outdoor Leadership Development). Saal is a graduate of NOLS (National Outdoor Leadership School).

Notable accomplishments 
 Co-Technical Leader of First all-Black U.S. expedition team to summit Mount Kilimanjaro. 2018
 Member of First all African American team to climb Denali. 2013

Advocacy 
Saal actively advocates for breaking down racial barriers in the outdoor community by volunteering for the GOLD program, and using her climbs to raise awareness for minorities accessing the outdoors.  Rosemary Saal told the Washington Post, "There’s been an intentional lack of access for black people. When Hillary first summited [Everest], black people couldn’t even vote in this country."

Accolades 
 Named Backpacker Magazine Heroes of the Year 2014

Filmography 
 Expedition Denali (2014, Outside TV) 
 An American Ascent (2016, 66 minutes, George Potter & Andy Adkins)

References

External links 
Instagram account

Living people
Year of birth missing (living people)
1990s births
American mountain climbers
American female climbers
21st-century American women